In Croatia:
Jezerce, Croatia, a village in Lika–Senj County

In Slovenia:
Jezerce pri Šmartnem, a settlement in the City Municipality of Celje
Jezerce pri Dobjem, a settlement in the Municipality of Dobje